The Kayu Ara LRT station is a light rapid transit (LRT) station that serves the suburb of Damansara Utama and Kampung Sungai Kayu Ara in Petaling Jaya Selangor, Malaysia. It will be one of the stations on the Shah Alam line. The station is located right next the Kayu Ara River. The station is an elevated rapid transit station in Petaling Jaya, Selangor, Malaysia, forming part of the Klang Valley Integrated Transit System.

The station is marked as Station No. 2 along with the RM9 billion line project with the line's maintenance depot located in Johan Setia, Klang. The Kayu Ara LRT station is expected to be operational in February 2024 and will have facilities such as multi-story park and ride, kiosks, restrooms, elevators, taxi stand, and feeder bus among others.

References

External links
 LRT3 Bandar Utama-Klang Line

Rapid transit stations in Selangor
Shah Alam Line